Chlanificula is a genus of sea snails, marine gastropod mollusks in the family Buccinidae, the true whelks.

Species
Species within the genus Chlanificula include:

 Chlanificula thielei Powell, 1958

References

External links

Buccinidae
Monotypic gastropod genera